Tzena may refer to:

 Kožuf, a mountain between Greece and Northern Macedonia
 Tzena, a period of austerity in Israel from 1949 to 1959
 Tzena u’Renah, a Yiddish-language prose work from the 1590s
 Tzena, Tzena, Tzena, a Hebrew song written in 1941

See also
Tzniut